{{DISPLAYTITLE:C5H9NO4}}
The molecular formula C5H9NO4 (molar mass 147.13 g/mol, exact mass: 147.0532 u) may refer to:

 O-Acetylserine, an α-amino acid
 Glutamic acid, a proteinogenic amino acid
 N-Methyl-D-aspartic acid, a specific agonist at the NMDA receptor
 L-threo-3-Methylaspartate